Les Zapartistes are a group of Quebecois comedians in Canada, founded in 2001 and specialising in political humour.  The group works live and for television, generally in the context of special events such as the annual Fête nationale du Québec as well as in various comedy programmes.

It won a Prix Gémeaux in 2004 (the francophone equivalent of Canada's Gemini awards) for best comedy, variety or talk-show performance.

The group's name comes from the Zapatista Army of National Liberation, a Mexican political movement that defends the Chiapas Indians, and from l'Aparté, a small Montreal café where the group was founded.  Despite a generally careful use of language, the group's slogan is "against corruption, cultural uniformity, soundbites and sloganeering, the privatisation of our natural resources, military incompetence and loads of other stuff."  («[...] s'opposer à la corruption, à la culture du consensus, à la langue de bois, à la privatisation de nos ressources, à la débilité militaire pis à ben d’autres affaires») This slogan is in their manifesto, whose style harkens back to the roots of Quebec's Quiet Revolution.

The humour of Les Zapartistes targets what they take to be immorality and illegality in Canadian politics.  The group advertises itself as supportive of Quebec independence with respect to the Canadian federal government, which has been undermined by the recent Sponsorship scandal, but does not necessarily promote Quebec sovereignty.

The group often performs parodies of popular music to make its point.  For example, its song Les Fonds publics (Public finance) is a parody of Les Amoureux des bancs publics by Georges Brassens, through which it attacks financial abuses in the production of television programmes. 

The members of Les Zapartistes are:
 François Parenteau
 François Patenaude
 Gaétan Troutet (the group's music specialist);
 Christian Vanasse
 Nadine Vincent (the group's editing specialist).

All members participate in writing and development, but Vincent does not perform.  Denis Trudel, Geneviève Rochette and Frédéric Savard are past members of the group.

External links
 Official website (in French)

Comedians from Quebec
Canadian comedy troupes